Bruno Rafael Bronetta da Silva (born 19 March 1984 in Mogi das Cruzes) is a former Brazilian footballer.

Career 
Bruno Bronetta beginning his career at Portuguesa where he served in all categories to the core team. Also served by Corinthians U-20.
He returned to Portugal Sports in July 2004, then went to Santo André for two seasons and the fine 2007 moved to FC Dinamo Minsk from Belarus. After two seasons returned to Brazil for the Caxias, where he remained until 2011.

Biography
Born in Mogi das Cruzes, São Paulo state, Bruno Bronetta started his career at Portuguesa.

Santo André
After an optimal Paulista championship campaign in 2006 by a team from Rio Branco Esporte Clube, in April 2006 he moved to Santo Andre to compete in the Championship series B, where they finished in sixth position. He renewed his contract with the team until December 2007 playing again in the series B Championship and Championship Paulista.

Dinamo Minsk
In December 2007 he moved to FC Dinamo Minsk, Belarus, where he signed a contract for three seasons. He played for the club in 2008 season.

Caxias
He returned to Brazil to play at this time SER Caxias do Sul, where he competed in the 2009 Gauchão reached the end of the second round against Internacional-RS and lost the title.
After a beautiful passage in 2009, returned to the club in November 2010 to compete in the 2011 Championship Gaucho, Brazil Cup and Championship Brasileiro.

Botafogo-SP
Signed contract with Botafogo-SP, had trouble coming to regularize the documentation of the Belarusian Federation and ended up playing only the final seven matches of the championship, but has won the Champion Interior Paulistão 2010.

Araxá Esporte Clube
It has come to Araxá to compete in the State Championship in 2012, became champion with one round in advance and putting the Araxá again after 22 years in the elite football Miner.

References

External links
 Conteúdo Esportivo - Ficha do Jogador
 RAMALHONAUTAS - Balançando a Rede!
 

1984 births
Living people
People from Mogi das Cruzes
Brazilian footballers
Association football midfielders
Brazilian expatriate footballers
Expatriate footballers in Belarus
Expatriate footballers in Greece
Associação Portuguesa de Desportos players
Rio Branco Esporte Clube players
Esporte Clube Santo André players
FC Dinamo Minsk players
Sociedade Esportiva e Recreativa Caxias do Sul players
Botafogo Futebol Clube (SP) players
Kavala F.C. players
Araxá Esporte Clube players
Associação Atlética Flamengo players
Footballers from São Paulo (state)